XHLRS-FM is a radio station licensed to Linares, Nuevo León, Mexico, serving Villagrán and Ciudad Victoria, Tamaulipas. It broadcasts on 95.3 FM and carries the company's La Lupe Spanish variety hits brand. The main transmitter is in Villagrán with a booster in Ciudad Victoria.

History 

XHLRS received its concession in October 1994 and has been owned by Multimedios throughout its history.

On June 1, 2020, Multimedios flipped the formats of XHLRS and XHPMAZ-FM in Mazatlán from the grupera La Caliente brand to Spanish variety hits as La Lupe.

References 

1994 establishments in Mexico
Radio stations established in 1994
Radio stations in Nuevo León
Radio stations in Tamaulipas
Spanish-language radio stations
Multimedios Radio